Felipe Monteiro Diogo (born 17 July 1988), known as Sodinha, is a Brazilian footballer who plays for Italian Serie D club Franciacorta.

Career

Early career
He began his career in the Paulista youth team, a team from his hometown, Jundiaí, and later decided to adopt the nickname "Sodinha", used by his father when he was a footballer. In 2008, at the age of 20, he was signed by Udinese, who in the following years sent him on loan to various Italian teams. He made his debut in Serie B in the 2008–09 season for Bari. At the end of the season, he had made 4 appearances, and Bari was promoted to Serie A by winning the championship. He would then be on loans at Paganese and Portogruaro in Lega Pro Prima Divisione.

Brescia
After being inactive for a season, he decided to return to Brazil and play for Ceará in 2012, but shortly after returned to Italy to join Brescia, in Serie B. There, he scored his first goal in a home victory over Varese. In the summer of 2014, following personal misconduct, he was demoted from the team by manager Ivo Iaconi. However, in October he was reinstated and called up.

Trapani and retirement
On 9 July 2015, Sodinha signed the one-year contract with option with Trapani. On 7 January 2016, he terminated his contract by mutual consent and retired from football at the age of 27, due to lingering injuries.

Return and lower leagues
In January 2017, having been cleared of injuries, he decided to return to football and signed a contract with Mantova in Lega Pro. In the summer of the same year, he signed a contract with Mestre, a team competing in Serie C, for the 2017–18 season. During the January 2018 transfer marketm he moved to AC Rezzato, a Serie D club in the Province of Brescia.

Modena
On 17 July 2019, Sodinha returned to professional football by signing for Modena in Serie C. His debut came on the second matchday against Piacenza, a match where he hit the crossbar after a penalty kick. In a short time, he became a cornerstone of the team under coaches Mauro Zironelli and later Michele Mignani, also becoming vice-captain of the canarino. He scored his first goal for Modena in the home match against Rimini, and later scored an important free-kick goal to equalize against Arzignano Valchiampo. In the home match against Ravenna, due to the absence of captain Armando Perna due to injury, he wore the captain's armband for the first time. In the beginning of January, in a friendly match against Colorno, he injured his calf which sidelined him for a month and a half.

After the season was abandoned due to the COVID-19 pandemic, Modena decided to renew his contract.

Franciacorta
In August 2021, Sodinha signed with Serie D club Franciacorta.

References

External links
 

1988 births
Living people
People from Jundiaí
Brazilian footballers
Brazilian expatriate footballers
Expatriate footballers in Italy
Paulista Futebol Clube players
Udinese Calcio players
S.S.C. Bari players
Paganese Calcio 1926 players
U.S. Triestina Calcio 1918 players
A.S.D. Portogruaro players
Ceará Sporting Club players
Brescia Calcio players
Trapani Calcio players
Mantova 1911 players
Modena F.C. players
Campeonato Brasileiro Série B players
Serie B players
Serie C players
Serie D players
Association football midfielders
Footballers from São Paulo (state)